The crayfish snake (Liodytes rigida), also known commonly as the glossy crayfish snake, the glossy swampsnake, the glossy water snake, and the striped water snake, is a species of semiaquatic snake in the subfamily Natricinae of the family Colubridae. The species is endemic to the southeastern United States, and preys mainly on crayfish.

Geographic range
L. rigida is found on the coastal plains of both the Atlantic Coast and the Gulf Coast: in eastern Texas, southeastern Oklahoma, southern Arkansas, Louisiana, southern Mississippi, southern Alabama, northern Florida, southern Georgia, eastern South Carolina, and southeastern North Carolina. There is also a disjunct population in eastern Virginia.

Description
Adults of L. rigida are on average 16 inches (about 41 cm) in total length (including tail), and are heavy-bodied.

L. rigida is olive brown dorsally. Additionally, two blackish dorsal stripes may or may not be present. The upper lips (labial scales) are yellow. Ventrally, it is yellow with two parallel series of black spots, which merge anteriorly into a single series. The ventral surface of the tail may have a median black line, or it may be unmarked.

The dorsal scales are arranged in 19 rows at midbody. They are strongly keeled, except for the first two rows. The first row (adjacent to the ventrals) is smooth, and the second row is weakly keeled. The ventrals number 132-142. The anal plate is divided. The subcaudals number 51-71, and are divided.

Diet
L. rigida eats crayfish.

Reproduction
L. rigida is viviparous.

Subspecies
Three subspecies of L. rigida are recognized as being valid, including the nominotypical subspecies.
Liodytes rigida deltae  – Delta crayfish snake
Liodytes rigida rigida  – glossy crayfish snake
Liodytes rigida sinicola  – Gulf crayfish snake

Nota bene: A trinomial authority in parentheses indicates that the subspecies was originally described in a genus other than Liodytes.

References

Further reading
Behler JL, King FW (1979). The Audubon Society Field Guide to North American Reptiles and Amphibians. New York: Alfred A. Knopf. 743 pp., 657 color plates. . ("Glossy Crayfish Water Snake (Regina rigida)", pp. 647-648 + Plate 474).
Conant R, Bridges W (1939). What Snake Is That? A Field Guide to the Snakes of the United States East of the Rocky Mountains. (With 108 drawings by Edmond Malnate). New York and London: D. Appleton-Century Company. Frontispiece map + viii + 163 pp. + Plates A-C, 1-32. ("STRIPED WATER SNAKE Natrix rigida ", p. 97 + Plate 17, figure 50).
Powell R, Conant R, Collins JT (2016). Peterson Field Guide to Reptiles and Amphibians of Eastern and Central North America, Fourth Edition. Boston and New York: Houghton Mifflin Harcourt. xiv + 494 pp., 47 plates, 207 figures. . ("GLOSSY SWAMPSNAKE Liodytes rigida ", p. 414 + Plate 41).
Say T (1825). "Descriptions of three new species of COLUBER, inhabiting the United States". J. Acad. Nat. Sci. Philadelphia 4 (2): 237-241. (Coluber rigidus, new species, pp. 239–240).
Stejneger L, Barbour T (1917). A Check List of North American Amphibians and Reptiles. Cambridge, Massachusetts: Harvard University Press. 125 pp. ("Natrix rigida ", p. 95).

External links
 http://www.flmnh.ufl.edu/herpetology/FL-GUIDE/Reginarigida.htm

Liodytes
Reptiles of the United States
Endemic fauna of the United States
Fauna of the Southeastern United States
Reptiles described in 1825
Taxa named by Thomas Say